Miss Jojo, born Josiane Uwineza, also known as Iman Uwineza, is a Rwandan R&B singer.  Her music blends R&B and traditional Rwandan musical elements.

History

Early years
Born in a town in the Bugesera District of Rwanda in 1983, Uwineza enjoyed singing and dancing as a child and her parents encouraged her to develop her talent.

Musical career
Uwineza launched her singing career after winning the 2007 Rector Excellence Award in the category of "Best Female Artiste" at the National University of Rwanda, where she was completing a Bachelor's Degree in English. Miss Jojo released her debut album, Genesis, the following year.

This was followed by the release of her second album, Woman, in 2012. Her latter album promotes the theme of female empowerment, a cause that the singer champions both on and off the stage. She also uses her lyrics to raise youth awareness of the dangers of drug abuse and HIV/AIDS and encourage Rwandans to participate in national development efforts and make wise choices for their future. She is very active in promoting humanitarian causes.

Personal life
In 2007 she publicly converted to Islam and changed her name from Josiane to Iman. This change attracted the attention of media reporters who speculated the singer had converted to please her then-boyfriend and producer, an allegation that Uwineza denies.

Awards

2012: Best Female artist (salax)
2011: Best Female artist (salax)
2010: Best Female artist (salax)
2010: Best female artist (ijoro ry'urukundo)
2010: Song of the year Siwezi Enda (ijoro ry'urukundo)
2009: Pam award (Pearl of Africa Music Award) Best Rwandan female artist
2009: Best female artist (salax)
2008: Pam award (Pearl of Africa Music Award) Best Rwandan female artist

References

1983 births
Living people
Rwandan women singers
Rwandan Muslims
Converts to Islam
People from Bugesera District